The 2016 season is Clube Atlético Mineiro's 108th in existence and tenth consecutive season in the top-flight of Brazilian football. Along with the Campeonato Brasileiro Série A and the Campeonato Mineiro, the club will also compete in the Copa Libertadores, the Copa do Brasil and the Primeira Liga.

Season overview

Background and pre-season 
Atlético Mineiro finished as runner-up in the previous season's Campeonato Brasileiro Série A, and qualified to the 2016 Copa Libertadores. Levir Culpi, the head coach for most of 2015, mutually terminated its contract in the end of that year, being replaced by Uruguayan Diego Aguirre, who took charge in January 2016. Atlético took part in Florida Cup, a pre-season competition in the US, which it won.

Players

Squad information
Players and squad numbers last updated on 26 June 2016.Note: Flags indicate national team as has been defined under FIFA eligibility rules. Players may hold more than one non-FIFA nationality.

Transfers

In

Loans in

Out

Technical staff 
{| class="wikitable"
|-
!Position
!Name
|-
|Head coach
| Marcelo Oliveira
|-
| rowspan="2"|Assistant coach
| Tico
|-
| Eduardo Abdo
|-
|Technical Supervisor
| Carlos Alberto Isidoro
|-
|Technical Coordinator
| Carlinhos Neves
|-
| rowspan="2"|Fitness coach
| Luís Otávio Kalil
|-
| Juvenilson de Souza
|-
|Goalkeeping coach
| Francisco Cersósimo
|-
|Sports Technology Assistant
| Alexandre Ceolin
|-

|Scout

| Bernardo Motta

|-
| rowspan="3" |Doctor
| Rodrigo Lasmar
|-
| Marcus Vinícius
|-
| Otaviano Oliveira
|-
| rowspan="2" |Physiotherapist
| Rômulo Frank
|-
| Guilherme Fialho
|-
|Physiologist
| Roberto Chiari
|-
|Dentist
| Marcelo Lasmar
|-
| rowspan="2" |Nutritionist
| Evandro Vasconcelos
|-
| Natália Carvalho
|-
| rowspan="3" |Masseur
| Belmiro Oliveira
|-
| Eduardo Vasconcelos
|-
| Hélio Gomes
|-
|Field Assistant
| Rubens Pinheiro
|-
| rowspan="2"|Kit manager
| João de Deus
|-
| Luciano Caxeado
|-

Pre-season

Competitions

Overview

Primeira Liga

Group stage

Campeonato Mineiro

First stage

Knockout stage

Semi-finals

Finals

Copa Libertadores

Group stage

Final stages

Round of 16

Quarter-finals

Campeonato Brasileiro Série A

League table

Results summary

Results by round

Matches

Due to the air accident that occurred with the Chapecoense team, victimizing 71 people, the last match of the Brazilian Championship against Atlético Mineiro was canceled, giving a double victory by 3 x 0.

Copa do Brasil

Round of 16

Quarterfinals

Semifinals

Final

References

External links
 Official website

 

Clube Atlético Mineiro seasons
Atletico Mineiro